Sembabule (sometimes spelled Ssembabule) is a town in Sembabule District in the Central Region of Uganda. The town is the main municipal, administrative, and commercial center of the district and the site of the district headquarters.

Location
The coordinates of the town are 0°04'48.0"S, 31°27'36.0"E (Latitude:-0.0800; Longitude:31.4600).

Population
The 2002 national census estimated the population of the town to be 4,010. In 2010, the Uganda Bureau of Statistics (UBOS) estimated the population at 4,700. In 2011, UBOS estimated the mid-year population at 4,800.

In 2015, the Uganda Bureau of Statistics estimated the mid-year population of Sembabule at 6,800 people. In 2020, the agency estimated the population of the town at 7,800. UBOS calculated the annual population growth rate to average 2.78 percent between 2015 and 2020.

Points of interest
The following additional points of interest lie within town or near the town limits:

1. The offices of Sembabule Town Council

2. The offices of Sembabule District Administration

3. Sembabule Central Market

4. Bigo bya Mugenyi, a prehistoric human settlement, dating back to the Iron Age, circa (1200–1000 BC)

5. The  Mpigi–Kabulasoke–Maddu–Sembabule Road, ends in this town.

See also
 List of cities and towns in Uganda

References

External links
Sembabule District Homepage

Sembabule District
Populated places in Central Region, Uganda
Cities in the Great Rift Valley